Stephen, Steven, or Steve Paul may refer to:

 Stephen Paul (photographer) (born 1987), Stephen Paul Photo, Los Angeles commercial and editorial photographer
 Stephen Paul (physicist) (1953–2012), physicist at Princeton University
 Stephen Paul (woodworker) (born 1951), American woodworker and craft distiller
 Esteban (musician) (Stephen Paul, born 1948), American guitarist
 Steve Paul (1941–2012), manager of Johnny Winter and club owner
 Steven Paul (born 1959), film producer and manager 
 Steven M. Paul, neuroscientist and pharmaceutical executive
 Steven Paul (fencer) (1954-2019), British fencer.

See also
 Steve Jobs (1955–2011), American tech mogul, full name Steven Paul Jobs